Chokhamela (Marathi :चोखामेळा) was a Hindu saint in Maharashtra, India in the 14th century. He belonged to the Mahar caste,, which was considered that time one of the untouchable castes in India. He was born at Mehuna Raja, a village in Deulgaon Raja Taluka of Buldhana district. He lived at Mangalvedha in Maharashtra. He wrote many Abhangas. One of his famous Abhangas is 'Abir Gulal Udhlit Rang".  He was one of the first low-cast poets in India.

Chokhamela lived with his wife Soyarabai and son Karmamela in Mangalvedha. Chokhamela's task was to guard and work in farms of upper-caste people. His family also followed varkari sect.<ref name=ZelliotA>{{cite book |last=Zelliot|first=Eleanor |authorlink=Eleanor Zelliot |chapter=Chokhamela, His Family and the Marathi Tradition |title=From Stigma to Assertion: Untouchability, Identity and Politics in Early and Modern India |editor1-first=Mik'ael|editor1-last=Aktor |editor2-first=Robert|editor2-last=Deliège |year=2008 |publisher=Museum Tusculanum Press |location=Copenhagen |isbn=978-8763507752 |pages=76–85}}</ref>

 Soyarabai - Wife 
 Nirmala - Sister and her husband Banka (who is brother of Soyarabai)
 Karmamela - Son

Chokhamela was initiated into bhakti (spirituality) by the poet-saint Namdev (1270-1350 CE). Once when he visited Pandharpur, he listened to Sant Namdev's kirtan. Already a devotee of Vitthal (Vithoba), Chokha was moved by Namdev's teachings.

Later, he moved to Pandharpur. The traditional story is that the upper castes here did not allow him to enter the temple, nor did they allow him to stand in the door of the temple, so he instead built a hut on the other side of the river Chandrabhaga.

While working on construction of a wall in Mangalvedha, near Pandharpur, the wall fell down, crushing some workers. Chokha was one of them. His tomb is in front of the Vitthal temple, Pandharpur, where it can be seen to this day. According to a legend the bones of the dead Chokhamela were still chanting Vitthal , Vitthal, apparently yearning to visit the Vitthal temple. The bones were buried at the footsteps of the Vitthal temple. In early 20th century, the Dalit leader B. R. Ambedkar attempted to visit the temple, but was stopped at the burial site of Chokhamela and denied entry beyond that point for being a Mahar.

BooksOn the Threshold: Songs of Chokhamela, translated from the Marathi by Rohini Mokashi-Punekar.
B. R. Ambedkar dedicated his book The Untouchables: Who are They and Why They Became Untouchables to the memory of Chokhamela, Nandanar and Ravidas.One Hundred Poems of Chokha Mela, translated from Marathi by Chandrakant Kaluram Mhatre. The Courtesan, the Mahatma and the Italian Brahmin: Tales from Indian History'' by Manu S. Pillai

References

External links
 Chokhamela (PDF) by Punekar
 Chokhamela and Eknath: Two Bhakti Modes of Legitimacy for Modern Change - Zelliot
 Chokhamela: The Pioneer of Untouchable movement in Maharashtra - Prof. Nimavat
 Sant Chokhamela information in Marathi

Medieval Hindu religious leaders
Warkari
Dalit saints
Dalit Hindu saints
14th-century Indian scholars
Scholars from Maharashtra
Vaishnava saints
Marathi Hindu saints